Pomacentrus vaiuli, the ocellate damselfish, is a species of damselfish in the family Pomacentridae from the Pacific Ocean. It occasionally makes its way into the aquarium trade.

References

External links
 Princess Damsel @ Fishes of Australia

vaiuli
Marine fish of Northern Australia
Fish described in 1906
Taxa named by David Starr Jordan